Sir Mathew Wilson, 1st Baronet  (29 August 1802 – 18 January 1891) was an English landowner and Liberal politician who sat in the House of Commons at various times between 1842 and 1886.

Wilson was the son of Mathew Wilson, a solicitor of Eshton Hall and his wife Mary Clive Wilson. His father and mother were first cousins. He was educated at Harrow School and Brasenose College, Oxford. He became a J.P. at the age of 22, and became the longest serving magistrate in Skipton's history at the time of his death aged 88.

Wilson was elected in 1841 as Member of Parliament for Clitheroe but was unseated in 1842. He stood again in 1847 and regained Clitheroe, but after the 1852 election was unseated again in 1853. Notwithstanding incidents of electoral malpractice, he was created a baronet on 28 February 1874 and later that year was elected as MP for West Riding of Yorkshire North. He held the seat until it was split up under the Redistribution of Seats Act 1885. In the 1885 general election, he was then elected for Skipton which he held until his defeat in 1886. He also became Deputy Lieutenant and Chairman of the Board of Guardians.

He married, June Louisa Emerson Amcotts, only daughter of Sir Wharton Emerson Amcotts, Bart, of Kettlethorpe Park, Lincolnshire, on 15 June 1826. They had a son Mathew (1827–1909) who succeeded to the baronetcy. She died in 1833 and many years later Wilson married Frances Pedler. His son Mathew married Gratiana Mary Thomas, daughter of Admiral Richard Darton Thomas (1777–1857).

Wilson died at Brighton aged 88.

References

External links 
 

1802 births
1891 deaths
People educated at Harrow School
Baronets in the Baronetage of the United Kingdom
Liberal Party (UK) MPs for English constituencies
UK MPs 1841–1847
UK MPs 1847–1852
UK MPs 1852–1857
UK MPs 1874–1880
UK MPs 1880–1885
UK MPs 1885–1886
Alumni of Brasenose College, Oxford
Deputy Lieutenants of Lancashire
English landowners
Deputy Lieutenants of the West Riding of Yorkshire
English justices of the peace
Members of the Parliament of the United Kingdom for constituencies in Lancashire
19th-century British businesspeople